Return of the Gunfighter is a 1967 American Western television film directed by James Neilson and starring Robert Taylor, Chad Everett and Ana Martín. Though intended for theatrical release, it was instead shown on television. Old Tucson and Sabino canyon are areas in the film.

Plot 
In 1878, an old gunslinger Ben Wyatt (Robert Taylor) is released from prison after five years. He meets Lee Sutton (Chad Everett), who is on the run for killing a man in a gunfight. Wyatt finds that his close friends the Domingos have been killed. He takes Sutton, who is weak from being wounded in the gunfight, to find Anisa Domingo (Ana Martin), the daughter of Wyatt's slain friends. Wyatt agrees to let Anisa help him find her parents’ killers.

The three ride toward Lordsburg. Sutton leaves them to go to his family's ranch. He and Anisa say goodbye but hope to see each other again. With Anisa's help, Wyatt finds the men responsible and they are Sutton's brothers. Wyatt kills one in a street gunfight in self-defense.

Lee finds that his older brother, Clay (Lyle Bettger), killed Anisa's parents. Lee leaves the ranch for Lordsburg to free Wyatt, who is in jail for the gunfight. Together, they defeat Clay and his thugs to save Anisa from being killed as the only witness to Clay's murders.

Cast
 Robert Taylor as Ben Wyatt 
 Chad Everett as Lee Sutton 
 Ana Martín as Anisa 
 Mort Mills as Will Parker 
 Lyle Bettger as Clay Sutton
 John Davis Chandler as Sundance 
 Michael Pate as Frank Boone
 Barry Atwater as Lomax
 John Crawford as Butch Cassidy 
 Willis Bouchey as Judge Ellis
 Rodolfo Hoyos, Jr. as Luis Domingo (as Rodolfo Hoyos)
 Boyd 'Red' Morgan as Wid Boone
 Henry Wills as Sam Boone 
 Robert Shelton as Cowboy
 Loretta Miller as Dance Hall Girl
 Janell Alden as Dance Hall Girl

See also
 List of American films of 1967

References
The Films of Robert Taylor, by Lawrence J. Quirk

External links 
 
 
 

1967 television films
American Western (genre) television films
1967 Western (genre) films
1960s English-language films
Films scored by Hans J. Salter
Metro-Goldwyn-Mayer films
1960s American films